The Mary White was a lifeboat based in Broadstairs, Kent, England, named in 1851 after the completion of an heroic rescue of a brig, the Mary White.

The Mary White with its sister boat, the Culmer White, took part in the rescue of the Northern Belle in January 1857. The Belle was an American transatlantic ship which ran aground near Thanet in blizzard conditions. The Culmer White and the Mary White made repeated trips to the damaged Belle and saved the entire crew.

See also
 Song of the Mary White
 Culmer White

References

 

Lifeboats
Shipwrecks in the Downs
Maritime incidents in 1851